Diderma globosum is a species of slime mould in the family Didymiaceae, first described by Christiaan Hendrik Persoon in 1794.

References

External links 
 Description of Diderma globosum at DiscoverLife

Taxa named by Christiaan Hendrik Persoon
Taxa described in 1794
Myxogastria